Acanthocephala is a phylum of parasitic platyzoan "worms".

Acanthocephala may also refer to:

 Acanthocephala (bug), a genus of Coreidae (leaf-footed bugs)
 A former cactus genus now a junior synonym of Parodia